A beaver dam is a structure built by beavers.

Beaver Dam or Beaverdam may also refer to:

Places

Canada
 Beaverdam, Alberta
 Beaver Dam, New Brunswick
 Beaver Dam, Nova Scotia

United States
 Beaver Dam, Arizona
 Beaver Dam, a dam on Beaver Lake, Arkansas
 Beaver Dam, Indiana
 Beaver Dam, Kentucky
 Beaver Dam (Maryland), flooded marble quarry
 Beaverdam, Missouri
 Beaver Dam Township, Butler County, Missouri
 Beaverdam, Nevada
 Beaver Dams, New York
 Beaver Dam Township, Cumberland County, North Carolina
 Beaver Dam (Knightdale, North Carolina), a historic plantation house
 Beaverdam, Ohio
 Beaver Dam, Texas
 Beaver Dam, Utah
 Beaverdam, Virginia
 Beaverdam, West Virginia
 Beaver Dam, Wisconsin
 Beaver Dam (town), Wisconsin
 South Beaver Dam, Wisconsin, an unincorporated community
 Beaver Dam Lake (Wisconsin)
 Beaver Dam Mountains Wilderness, in Arizona and Utah
 Beaver Dam River, in Wisconsin

Battles 
 Battle of Beaver Dam Creek, in the American Civil War, 1862
 Battle of Beaver Dams, in the War of 1812

See also

 Beaverdam Creek (disambiguation)
 Beaver Dam Lake (disambiguation)
 Beaver Dam State Park (disambiguation)